Syntomodrillia curacaoensis is a species of sea snail, a marine gastropod mollusc in the family Drilliidae.

Description
The length of the shell varies between 6.8 mm and 7.9 mm.

Distribution
This marine species occurs off Curaçao

References

 Fallon P.J. (2016). Taxonomic review of tropical western Atlantic shallow water Drilliidae (Mollusca: Gastropoda: Conoidea) including descriptions of 100 new species. Zootaxa. 4090(1): 1–363

External links
 

curacaoensis
Gastropods described in 2016